The 2019 European Parliament election in Lithuania was held on 26 May 2019 to elect delegation from Lithuania to the European Parliament. It was part of the wider 2019 European election. The second round of the 2019 Lithuanian presidential election took place at the same time.

301 candidates from 16 parties stood for 11 seats.

Results

The Homeland Union received the most votes (19.74 per cent) and most seats (3), although it won only in 12 (or just over one-fifth of) municipalities. The Social Democratic Party of Lithuania received 15.88 per cent of the votes and 2 seats. This party won in 35 municipalities. The Lithuanian Farmers and Greens Union received 12.56 per cent of the votes and 2 seats. This party won in 6 municipalities. The Labour Party received 8.99 per cent of the votes and won 1 seat. This party won in 1 municipality.

Although Order and Justice and the Social Democratic Labour Party of Lithuania failed to win seats, these parties managed to obtain plurarities in two municipalities (one municipality for each party).

See also 
 Lithuania (European Parliament constituency)
 List of members of the European Parliament for Lithuania, 2019–24
 Members of the European Parliament 2019–2024

References

External links 
Official page

Lithuania
European Parliament elections in Lithuania
European